Antônio Giusfredi (19 May 1908 – 10 March 1991) was a Brazilian hurdler. He competed in the men's 110 metres hurdles at the 1932 Summer Olympics.

References

External links

1908 births
1991 deaths
Athletes (track and field) at the 1932 Summer Olympics
Brazilian male hurdlers
Olympic athletes of Brazil
20th-century Brazilian people